Boris Dmitrievich Zimin (born November 24, 1968) is a Russian businessman and public figure, philanthropist, motor sportsman. The son of Dmitry Zimin, (1933-2021), the founder of VimpelCom company (brand name Beeline). Boris Zimin is involved with the Zimin Foundation, which finances and supports Russian non-profit educational projects in the field of education, protection of human rights and freedom of speech, as well as scientific research in the field of  natural sciences (mathematics, biology and medicine).

Biography 
Born on November 24, 1968 in Moscow to parents Dmitry Borisovich Zimin, head of the laboratory at the Radio Technical Institute of the Russian Academy of Sciences, and Maya Pavlovna Zimina (née Shakhmatova, born 1936), an archaeologist. Graduated from the Higher School of Economics. Served in the Soviet Armed Forces from 1987-1989, carrying out most of his service in Kazakhstan.

In 2002, Boris Zimin became president of the investment company BMT Management, which manages his father's funds.

Boris Zimin has seven children. His first wife is Lyudmila Zakharova (1992-1997), and his second is Ella Zimina (1997-2009, three children were born in this marriage). He married his third wife, Yulia Prokhorova, in 2012. 

Since 2004, Boris Zimin lived in London and later moved to the United States. Since 2020 lives in Israel.

Social activities 

In 2001, Dmitry Zimin created a Dynasty Foundation aimed at supporting and developing Russian education, science and its popularization. The fund’s annual amount was set at $10 million. The son left his business in order to support the sciences alongside his father: first as a member of the Board, and starting in 2004, as Chairman of the Foundation's Board of Trustees. On May 25, 2015, the foundation was declared a "foreign agent" by the Ministry of Justice. In June, Moscow’s Tverskoy District Court fined Dynasty 300,000 rubles for refusing to self-register as a foreign agent. On July 5, Zimin Sr. decided to liquidate Dynasty and close its programs until the end of 2015.

In 2014, during the consideration of the complaint of Boris Zimin, who, due to the restriction imposed by bailiffs, had to postpone a business trip abroad, the Constitutional Court of the Russian Federation declared the detention of debtors at the border of the Russian Federation illegal.

In early 2014 Boris Zimin became the founder of the Sreda Foundation. Dmitry Zimin's capital was called the source of financing. In the first year, the fund allocated multimillion-dollar funding to independent liberal media: TV channels “Dozhd” and “TV2”, online media Colta.ru and “Mediazona”, the newspapers “Pskov province” and “Free course”, etc. It was assumed that these media outlets would receive support in the same amount in 2015 and 2016. However On July 28, 2015, by decision of the Ministry of Justice the fund was declared a "foreign agent". On July 30, Boris Zimin announced that the Sreda Foundation would be closed.

At the end of 2015, the Zimins announced that they would continue their activities in Russia, as well as expand them to the UK through the Zimin Foundation and Sreda Foundation. 

In 2016, the Sreda Foundation established Redkollegia (in Russian "Editorial Board") - a new independent award to support independent journalists in Russia. The Redkollegiya award is presented every month; these are not statuettes or diplomas, but monetary prizes — they are given to a journalist or a group of journalists for an amount chosen by a professional jury. In an interview in 2018, Boris Zimin reported that in 2015 only Russian legal entities were liquidated, while work to support the media continued.

In 2016, it became known that Boris Zimin and Mikhail Khodorkovsky were in talks with Galina Timchenko in 2014 about investing in a new media outlet, Meduza. Unable to reach an agreement, Khodorkovsky and Zimin each paid $250,000 as “compensation,” which was used to repay debts to launch the publication. In 2018, Kommersant wrote that in 2017, Boris Zimin donated $100,000 to the new outlet The Bell by Yelizaveta Osetinskaya.

In June 2022 Technion – Israel Institute of Technology and the Zimin Foundation signed an agreement to support the establishment and operation of the Zimin Institute for AI Solutions in Healthcare at the Technion. On opening day of Zimin Institute in Technion Boris Zimin became Technion Guardian, a designation reserved for those who have reached the highest level of support of the institution. 

In November 2022 Boris Zimin appointed Board Member of Nemtsov Foundation.

Political activity 
Since 2011, Boris Zimin was the main public sponsor of the politician Alexei Navalny and Anti-Corruption Foundation (FBK). He was among the first 16 founding sponsors who raised 4.4 million rubles to create the FBK in 2011, and the first, along with Vladimir Ashurkov, to publicly announce his support for the fund. In 2012, Zimin reported that he sent 300,000 rubles a month to support the FBK. In 2020, he confirmed that he continued to finance the foundation on a monthly basis. Zimin Jr. also supports the politician Ilya Yashin, but only from time to time. He also provides support to political prisoners — both morally and financially. At the end of July 2020, Alexei Navalny published his tax return, according to which his 2019 income amounted to 5.4 million rubles. Navalny called entrepreneur Boris Zimin the main source of income for his individual enterprise.

In August 2020, Boris Zimin paid for the emergency evacuation from Omsk to Berlin of Navalny who had fallen into a coma. The private jet and the services of German doctors costed 79,000 euros.

In August 2020, during the protests in Belarus, Boris Zimin donated to Belarus Solidarity Foundation.

After 24 February 2022, Zimin Foundation started a few programs for refugees from Ukraine and Russia. They are intended for scientists, students, and journalists. Boris Zimin is a member of The Russian Anti-War Committee  and of The Russian Action Committee. Both organizations oppose the war unleashed by Putin and support the unity of anti-war and pro-democracy Russians. 

On September 2, 2022, the Ministry of Justice included Boris Zimin in the list of individuals acting as a foreign agent. 

The Russian Interior Ministry has placed philanthropist Boris Zimin on the wanted list. Zimin is charged with illegal alienation of common shares of BelkaCar, a Russian car sharing company. The Investigative Committee has demanded that the charity patron be arrested in absentia. Boris Zimin says the case filed for political reasons.

References 

1968 births
20th-century Russian businesspeople
21st-century Russian businesspeople
21st-century philanthropists
Russian philanthropists
Businesspeople from Moscow

Living people
Russian activists against the 2022 Russian invasion of Ukraine
People listed in Russia as foreign agents